Margarites cabernet is a species of sea snail, a marine gastropod mollusk in the family Margaritidae.

Description
The height of the shell attains 7 mm.

Distribution
This marine species occurs off Northern Honshu, Japan.

References

cabernet
Gastropods described in 2000